"The Boys in the Back Room" is a song written by Frank Loesser, set to music by Frederick Hollaender and performed by Marlene Dietrich in the film Destry Rides Again (1939). It is often referred to as "See What the Boys in the Back Room Will Have". Her winking performance was a parody of her vampish roles in earlier films such as The Blue Angel (1930) and Blonde Venus (1932).  The song became a standard part of her repertoire, second only to "Lili Marlene". She also sang a German version called "Gib doch den Männern am Stammtisch ihr Gift".

The song appeared in several other movies.  It was featured in the Audie Murphy Western Gunsmoke (1953), sung in the town saloon by Cora Dufrayne, played by Mary Castle.  In Rainer Werner Fassbinder's film World on a Wire (1973), Ingrid Caven performs the song. It is often sung by Lieutenant Gruber in 'Allo 'Allo!.  Also sung by Monique Duchamps (played by Angela Richards) in 1979 in the series Secret Army, episode "Ring of Rosies".  It was performed by Alexis Colby (played by Joan Collins) in an episode of Dynasty in 1984. The song also appeared in Call of Duty WW2, on the mission Operation Cobra. If you listen to the radio at the beginning, you will hear this song play.

References

External links
Lyrics at Mojim

1939 songs
Songs written for films
Songs written by Frank Loesser
Songs with music by Friedrich Hollaender